Spectre AI Incorporated was a private software company that served various government agencies and defense contractors in the early 2000s. The company is notable for having developed and deployed the first functional presence engine in 2001 (the system predated SIRI by six years). Spectre AI's initial contract with Raytheon was the direct result of a request on the floor of the United States Congress on September 13, 2001 by Senators Judd Gregg and Ernest Hollings. This was a surprising amount of access given the company was started one year earlier in Spokane, Washington.

Spectre AI went on to create a suite of agent-based software products that were deployed for various government agencies and defense contractors. In late 2002 the company merged with Next-IT where it continued to operate as a wholly owned subsidiary. 

In 2004, the company revealed that it was working on public facing technology and developed the US Army's first AI recruiter, SGT STAR. The project later became controversial, and was the subject of numerous FOIA requests by the Electronic Frontier Foundation over fears that the mechanism was overly invasive, which proved not to be the case.

History 
Spectre AI Incorporated was founded by Philip Galland and Robert Hust. Galland, initially the company's primary investor, left his position at Oracle to become the company's CEO. In 2004, He and cofounder Robert Hust (the inventor of the functional presence engine) went on to form Agent Science Technologies, Inc. Next IT subsequently merged with defense contractor Verint Systems.

Spectre AI is no longer operational.

References 

Defence companies
Software companies based in Washington (state)
AI companies
Companies based in Spokane, Washington